This is a list of heads of government of British Cameroons

Affiliations

See also 
Cameroon
Politics of Cameroon
Heads of state of Cameroon
Heads of government of Cameroon
Colonial heads of British Cameroon (Cameroons)
Colonial heads of French Cameroon (Cameroun)
Heads of government of French Cameroon (Cameroun)
Colonial heads of German Cameroon (Kamerun)
Colonial heads of Ambas Bay (Victoria Colony)
Lists of office-holders

Government of Cameroon
Lists of heads of government
Cameroon history-related lists
British Cameroon